This Modern World is an album by pianist and bandleader Stan Kenton featuring performances of compositions by Robert Graettinger recorded between 1951 and 1953 and originally released as a 10-inch LP on Capitol as well as a set of three 7 inch 45 rpm singles.

Critical reception

The Allmusic review by Richard S. Ginell calls it "the most complex, atonal, uncompromising, potentially alienating music that even the iconoclastic Stan Kenton band ever played" and said "This Modern World moves even further away from jazz into abstract contemporary classical music... A jazz pulse occasionally surfaces but more often instruments drift in atonal clusters past each other in differing meters or blast dissonant fanfares, creating a feeling of unease as they converse quizzically".

Track listing
All compositions by Robert Graettinger.

 "A Horn" - 4:04
 "Some Saxophones" - 3:13
 "A Cello" - 4:59
 "A Thought" - 4:52
 "A Trumpet" - 4:46
 "An Orchestra" - 4:03
 Recorded at Capitol Recording Studios in Hollywood, CA on December 5, 1951 (track 1), March 20, 1952 (track 3), February 11, 1953 (tracks 5 & 6) and May 28, 1953 (tracks 2 & 4)

Personnel
 Stan Kenton - piano, conductor
 Conte Candoli (tracks 1, 5 & 6), Pete Candoli (tracks 5 & 6), Buddy Childers (tracks 5 & 6), John Coppola (track 1), Don Dennis (tracks 5 & 6), Maynard Ferguson (tracks 1, 5 & 6), John Howell (track 1), Ruben McFall (tracks 5 & 6), Stu Williamson (track 1) - trumpet
 Harry Betts (track 1), Bob Burgess (tracks 5 & 6), Bob Fitzpatrick (track 1), Dick Kenney (track 1), Keith Moon (tracks 5 & 6), Frank Rosolino (tracks 5 & 6), Bill Russo (tracks 1, 5 & 6) - trombone
 George Roberts - bass trombone (tracks 1, 5 & 6)
 John Graas (tracks 1, 4 & 6), Lloyd Otto (tracks 1, 4 & 6), George Price (track 1) - French horn
 Stan Fletcher - tuba (track 1)
 Vinnie Dean (tracks 5 & 6), Herb Geller (tracks 2 & 4), Lee Konitz (tracks 5 & 6), Dick Meldonian (track 3), Art Pepper (track 1) - alto saxophone
 Bud Shank - alto saxophone, flute (tracks 1-4)
 Bob Cooper - tenor saxophone, oboe, English horn (tracks 1-4)
 Bart Caldarell - tenor saxophone, clarinet, bassoon (tracks 1-4)
 Bob Gioga - baritone saxophone, bass clarinet (tracks 1, 3, 5 & 6)
 John Rotella - baritone saxophone (tracks 2 & 4)
 Earl Cornwell, Phil Davidson, Barton Gray, Maurice Koukel, Alex Law, Seb Mercurio, Dwight Muma, Danny Napolitano, Charlie Scarle, Ben Zimberoff - violin (track 1)
 Paul Israel, Aaron Shapiro, Dave Smiley - viola (track 1)
 Gregory Bemko (tracks 1 & 3), Zachary Bock (track 1), Gabe Jellen (track 1) - cello
 Ralph Blaze (track 1), Sal Salvador (tracks 5 & 6) - guitar
 Don Bagley (tracks 1, 3, 5 & 6), Abe Luboff (track 1) - bass
 Frank Capp (track 3), Stan Levey (tracks 5 & 6), Shelly Manne (track 1) - drums

References

Stan Kenton albums
1953 albums
Capitol Records albums
Albums conducted by Stan Kenton
Albums produced by Lee Gillette